Coloring or colouring may refer to:

 Color, or the act of changing the color of an object
 Coloring, the act of adding color to the pages of a coloring book
 Coloring, the act of adding color to comic book pages, where the person's job title is Colorist
 Graph coloring, in mathematics
 Hair coloring
 Food coloring
 Hand-colouring of photographs
 Map coloring

See also 
 Color code (disambiguation)
 Color grading